The 2018 ACT Clay Court International was a professional tennis tournament played on outdoor clay courts. It was the third edition of the tournament and part of the 2018 ITF Women's Circuit. It took place in Canberra, Australia, on 19–25 March 2018. It was the first of two tournaments held back-to-back at the same location.

Singles main draw entrants

Seeds 

 1 Rankings as of 5 March 2018.

Other entrants 
The following players received a wildcard into the singles main draw:
  Masa Jovanovic
  Genevieve Lorbergs
  Ivana Popovic
  Alicia Smith

The following players received entry from the qualifying draw:
  Maddison Inglis
  Kaylah McPhee
  Abbie Myers
  Ramu Ueda

Champions

Singles

 Dalila Jakupović def.  Destanee Aiava 6–4, 6–4

Doubles
 
 Priscilla Hon /  Dalila Jakupović def.  Miyu Kato /  Makoto Ninomiya 6–4, 4–6, [10–7]

External links 
 Official website
 2018 ACT Clay Court International at ITFtennis.com

2018 ITF Women's Circuit
2018 in Australian tennis
Tennis tournaments in Australia